The following highways are numbered 336:

Australia

Canada
 Manitoba Provincial Road 336
 Nova Scotia Route 336
 Prince Edward Island Route 336

Costa Rica
 National Route 336

India
 National Highway 336 (India)

Italy
 State road 336

Japan
 Japan National Route 336

United States
  Arkansas Highway 336
 Florida:
  County Road 336 (Levy County, Florida)
  County Road 336 (Marion County, Florida)
  Georgia State Route 336 (former)
  Illinois Route 336
  Louisiana Highway 336
  Louisiana Highway 336-1
  Louisiana Highway 336-2
  Maryland Route 336
  Minnesota State Highway 336
 New York:
  New York State Route 336
  County Route 336 (Erie County, New York)
  Puerto Rico Highway 336
  South Carolina Highway 336
  Tennessee State Route 336
 Texas:
  Texas State Highway 336
  Texas State Highway Loop 336
  Virginia State Route 336
  Wyoming Highway 336